Aestuariibius is a Gram-negative genus of bacteria from the family of Rhodobacteraceae with one known species (Aestuariibius insulae). Aestuariibius insulae has been isolated from a tidal flat sediments from the Yellow Sea in Korea.

References

Rhodobacteraceae
Bacteria genera
Monotypic bacteria genera